Shahshahan Mausoleum is a historical mausoleum in Isfahan, Iran. It is located beside Jameh mosque and is the burial place of a famous Sufi of Isfahan, Shah Alaeddin Mohammad. According to the date of Shah Alaeddin's death, which was in the December 1446, the mausoleum was built between 1446 and 1448. The interior and exterior of the mausoleum is decorated by calligraphy, plasterwork and tiling. Its dome, which was being destroyed, has been rebuilt, but the mausoleum is in need of repairs.

History

Shahshahan Mausoleum is one of the historical buildings in Isfahan. It is located in the northern part of the city, beside Jameh Mosque on Ibn-e Sina Street. The area around it is called Shahshahan Place. It is the burial place of Shah Alaeddin Mohammad also referred to as Seyyed Alaeddin Mohammad. He is descended from the third Imam of the Shi'ites the grandson of Mohammad, Husayn ibn Ali. His ancestors are traced back twenty four generations to Mohammad. According to historian Jean Chardin, in the old days, this section of Isfahan was known as the area of Houseinieh, because it was believed that the great grandsons of Hossein, Ali's son and Mohammad's grandson lived there.

The mausoleum is an important shrine that belongs to the Timurid period (1370-1507). It was built between 1446 and 1448 by the order of Sultan Muhammad bin Baysonqor, the grandson of Shahrukh Mirza and one of Timur's grandsons.

Shah Alaeddin Mohammad was an Imam (leader). He was highly respected by Sultan Mohammad  as he was the most outstanding scholar of his time. In addition to being the leader, Shah Alaeddin was the authority and the head of the religious hierarchy. Thus he was next in line to the king. It was for having these two high positions that he was known as Shahshahan (king of kings). He was given the responsibility of checking the validity of Ulama (religious elite) who claimed to be Seyyed (descendants of Mohammad).

In those years, territorial rivalry was common among different rulers. This fueled by the potential hatred and animosity between Shia and Sunni caused tremendous tension between Sultan Muhammad who was supported by his Shia leaders and Shahrukh.

As a result, when Shahrukh Mirza was in Harat and Sultan Muhammad was appointed by him as the ruler of Isfahan, Sultan Muhammad started to disobey Shahrukh and rebelled against him. Shahrukh came back from Harat to Isfahan to capture him. But Sultan Muhammad managed to escape from Isfahan to Shiraz and later to Lorestan. Faced with this grim situation, Shahrukh angrily ordered the arrest and execution of seven of Sultan Muhammas's close associates, including Shah Alaeddin Mohammad, who had supported Sultan Muhammad's revolt.

Shahrukh exiled Shah Alaeddin to Saveh. Instigated by his Sunni wife, Goharshad Begum, Shahrukh ordered the hanging of Shah Alaeddin in Saveh on December 11, 1446 (13 Ramazan 850). According to most Persian historical texts, this atrocity and the consequent curse on the Timur's dynasty was believed to have ended the life of Shahrukh eighty days after the death of Shah Alaeddin. Subsequent to Shahrukh's death, Sultan Muhammad bin Baysonqor came back to Isfahan and ordered to bury Shah Alaeddin's body in the Khanqah he had preached in. He ordered also to build the Shahshahan mausoleum on his grave. Shah Alaeddin's descendants have been also buried in the mausoleum, but their graves have been defaced over the years.

Description

According to the date of Shah Alaeddin's death, which was in the December 1446, the mausoleum was built between 1446 and 1448. Inside and outside of the mausoleum is decorated by plasterwork and tiling. The grave of Shah Alaeddin is in the middle with no tomb stone. All around the dome there are writings, including fourteen poems in Arabic that describe the event of the killing of Shah Alaeddin. These writings ends with the name of its calligrapher Seyyed Mahmood Naghash.

All around the mausoleum, the lower section of the walls are decorated with beautiful tile works that are hexagon shaped.

On the north side there is calligraphy on plaster stating that the body of a female member of the Safavi family, named Banoo Sultan was buried in the mausoleum, before it was moved to Mashhad. In addition, on the top of the door on the east side, there are three lines of poem from Saadi Shirazi that are less visible.

It is important to note that the mausoleum had been repaired during the rule of the Shah Abbas I Safavi in 1604 (1013 Hegirae), because it was for sometime the burial place of Banoo Sultan.

Endowments and related documents
As part his respect to Shah Alaeddin Mohammad, after the construction of the mausoleum, Sultan Muhammad made several major endowments for the Shahshahan Mausoleum. They included, among others, the village of Esfehanak, Isfahan, the village of Valasan in Freidan and Darzian in the district of Kararag, or Keraj Rural District located mostly about few miles south on the road from Isfahan to Shiraz. These properties were primarily cultivated farms and orchards. The intention was to use the income, generated by these endowments, to pay for the upkeep and  expenses of the Mausoleum and its Hosseinieh and also for feeding the poor and needy.

The scroll documenting the endowment of the aforementioned properties has been certified by several prominent scholars, including Sheikh Baha al-Din Muhammad al-'Amili during the Safavid kings. This document, as part of the valuable collection of the historical documents of Hossein Shahshahani was given to the Reza Abbasi Museum in Tehran in 1978 (1357).

Additionally, according to the endowment document, the trustee in charge must be a descendant of this dynasty (Shahshahani or Shah Alaie families), whoever at times is the most trusted, respected, pious and learned person.

The act of endowment took place in 1446 (850 Hegirae) and the endowment document is dated 1448 (852).

Recent years
In recent years, specifically from the early 1930s to late 1950s, Hossein Shahshahani, a descendant of Shah Alaeddin, managed to restore and re-establish the identity of Shahshahan mausoleum during his long judicial career. He battled in courts for many years to extricate the endowments of the Shahshahan mausoleum from unlawful occupiers. He repaired and rebuilt the mausoleum as an important historical building and constructed the Shahshahan School and Shahshahan Health Center beside it. He was helped by his younger brother Morteza Shahshahani who was a resident of Isfahan.

Shahshahani, who was buried in the mausoleum in 1962, had registered the mausoleum with the Iran Society For National and Historical Monuments under Registration Number 368 on February 21, 1949 (2 Esfand 1327).

After the Iranian Revolution in 1979, very little or no attention is paid to this important Timurid monument, in spite of the fact that the organization of  Isfahan Cultural Heritage (Miras-e Farhangi) is in the neighborhood of the Shahshahan Circle.

References 

Buildings and structures completed in 1448
Mausoleums in Isfahan